Prof. Dr. Elham Manea (born 1966) is a Swiss and Yemeni writer, professor, and human rights advocate. She is known for her human rights advocacy, especially for her  defence of women's rights, freedom of expression, freedom of/from religion, minority and LGBT rights in the Arab and Islamic world (s). She has participated in several human rights campaigns in the MENA region and is considered part of the Islamic feminist movement that insists on the  possibility of gender equality in Muslim majority countries. She has led mixed prayers in London, Bern, Berlin, Cape Town and Oxford in cooperation with inclusive mosques and open mosques initiatives.

Elham Manea is a strong critic of far right religious groups ideologies inside and outside the MENA region. She has contributed to the knowledge production on women's rights in the MENA region and women under Muslim Laws with two well received books:
The Arab State and Women's Rights: The Trap of Authoritarian Governance (Routledge, 2011)The Arab State and Women's rights  and  Women and Sharia Law: The Impact of Legal Pluralism in the UK (I.B. Tauris, 2016).Women and Sharia Law

Prof. Dr. Manea is a regular guest in Arabic news channels and talk shows such as BBC Arabic and Al Hurra. She has been also featured as a commentator in Swiss news, radio and TV.

Background and academic Research 

Elham Manea graduated from Kuwait University in 1989 with a bachelor's degree in political science and American University in 1995 with a master's degree in comparative politics. Manea is a Fulbright scholar who holds a Venia Legendi (Habilitation) and a PhD degree in political science from the University of Zurich. She was officially promoted to a titular professor in February 2023.

Manea worked as a radio and on-line journalist at Swiss Radio International (Swissinfo) until 2005. Between 2010 and 2019 she was a member of the Federal Commission for Women Affairs.  In 2020 she was appointed as a member of the Federal Commission for Migration, where she serves as a vice president.Die Eidgenössische Migrationskommission EKM  Manea is member of the scientific advisory board of the Austrian Documentation Center for Political Islam. In 2010

Prof. Dr. Elham Manea is a titular professor of political science at the Political Science Institute, Zurich University. She also works as an independent consultant. 

Her research focuses on regional politics of the Arabian Peninsula, Fragile States in conflict zones in the MENA region, especially Yemen, Gender and Politics and Women under Muslim Laws and Islamism.

She has published academic and nonfiction books in English, German, and Arabic in addition to two novels in Arabic.  Her latest research project focuses on the outcomes of the Arab Uprisings. Two book publications are planned: One with the title The Yemeni Civil War: The Arab Spring, State Formation, and Internal Instability; and another with title Gulf Rivalry and the Divergent Outcomes of the Arab Uprisings.

Bibliography 

Elham Manea has published academic and nonfiction books in English, German, and Arabic. Her publications include:

Echo (2005 Saqi Books Beirut)

Sins (2008 Saqi Books Beirut) 

The Arab State and Women's Rights: The Trap of Authoritarian Governance 

Ich will nicht Schweigen: Der Islam, Der Westen und die Menschenrechte (2009) Freiburg: Herder Verlag.

Regional Politics of the Gulf (2005, Saqi Books)

Women and Sharia Law: The Impact of Legal Pluralism in the UK (2016 I.B.Tauris)

Der alltägliche Islamismus (2018, Kösel)

The Perils of Nonviolent Islamism (Telos Press, New York, February 2021) (English Translation 
of Der Alltägliche Islamismus).

Frauen und die Scharia: Die Auswirkungen des Rechtspluralismus in Großbritannien
Wenn Religionsrecht mit Zivilrecht kollidiert.Mit einem Ausblick auf Deutschland, Österreich und die Schweiz (2021, Ibidem, German Translation of Women and Sharia Law) 14

For more on Elham Manea's books see her amazon page 1 
https://www.amazon.com/Books-Elham-Manea/s?rh=n%3A283155%2Cp_27%3AElham+Manea

References

Further reading 

1966 births
Living people
Academic staff of the University of Zurich
Yemeni women writers
American University School of International Service alumni
Place of birth missing (living people)
20th-century Yemeni writers
20th-century Yemeni women writers
21st-century Yemeni writers
21st-century Yemeni women writers
University of Zurich alumni